Asgarabad Tappeh (also Romanized as ‘Asgarābād Tappeh; also known as Asgar Ābād, Asgar Abadé Kooh, ‘Asgarābād-e Kūh, Aşgharābād, Aşgharābād-e Tappeh, ‘Askarābād, and Askerābād) is a village in Nazluy-ye Jonubi Rural District, in the Central District of Urmia County, West Azerbaijan Province, Iran. At the 2006 census, its population was 712, in 199 families.

References 

Populated places in Urmia County